Huon Aquaculture is a large aquaculture and food processing enterprise located in Tasmania, Australia. Founded in 1986, Huon has grown to become the second largest salmon producer in the state, after ASX listed Tassal; it employs 487 Tasmanians and produces 25,000 tonnes of salmon annually. It became a subsidiary of the Brazilian meat processing company JBS S.A. in November 2021.

Huon operates fish pens in Storm Bay, off Bruny Island, Macquarie Harbour, near Strahan, and Hideaway Bay, near Dover, a fish processing, packing and value-added facility in Parramatta Creek, Tasmania.

In 2020, Huon Aquaculture was convicted of environmental breaches in regard to its operations at Whale Point and fined $40,000.

As of 2021, Huon has additional assets in Western Australia including a processing facility in Perth and a 2,200 hectare lease in the Mid West aquaculture zone.

It was a majority family and employee owned company listed on the Australian Securities Exchange, but was acquired by JBS in November 2021.

See also 
 Seafood in Australia

References

External links
 

Seafood companies of Australia
Companies based in Tasmania
Companies formerly listed on the Australian Securities Exchange
Companies established in 1986
1986 establishments in Australia
Fish farming companies
Aquaculture in Australia